Brian K. Hopkins (born November 8, 1961) is a Democratic Alderman of Chicago, representing the 2nd Ward. The 2nd Ward includes Streeterville, Old Town, Lincoln Park, Ukrainian Village, Wicker Park, Bucktown and the Gold Coast. Prior to his election to the Chicago City Council, he served as Chief of Staff to Cook County Commissioner John P. Daley.

Early life
Hopkins was born in Fort Huachuca, Arizona while his father served in the United States Army. His parents were natives of Chicago's McKinley Park neighborhood, and returned there shortly after his birth.

Personal life
Hopkins resides in the Lincoln Park neighborhood with his wife and son.

City Council
He is a member of the following committees: Budget and Government Operations; Committees, Rules and Ethics; Health and Environmental Protection; Human Relations; Pedestrian and Traffic Safety; and Special Events, Cultural Affairs and Recreation.

In November 2019, Hopkins was one of fifteen aldermen to oppose a $72 million property tax increase in Mayor Lori Lightfoot's first budget that included $7 million in funding for City Colleges, $32 million in funding to retire a general obligation bond issue and $18 million in funding for libraries. However, he voted for the budget as a whole.

References

External links
 Official Website

1961 births
21st-century American politicians
Chicago City Council members
Illinois Democrats
Living people
University of Illinois at Springfield alumni